Capitanejo is one of the 31 barrios of the municipality of Ponce, Puerto Rico.  Along with Anón, Coto Laurel, Guaraguao, Quebrada Limón, Real, San Patricio, and Marueño, and the coastal barrio of Canas, Capitanejo is one of the municipality's nine bordering barrios.  It borders the municipality of Juana Diaz. Along with Playa, Bucana, Vayas and Canas, Capitanejo is also one of Ponce's five coastal barrios. Together with Vayas, Capitanejo is also one of two rural coastal barrios in the municipality. It was founded in 1822.

Location
Capitanejo is a rural, coastal barrio located in the southeastern section of the municipality, southeast of the city of Ponce.  The toponymy, or origin of the name, makes reference to the proper noun of a local junior or lieutenant commander below a cacique, or a local junior commander subject to a superior authority. The barrio formed from a community of tobacco plant growers dating back to the 1680s.

Boundaries
Capitanejo is bounded on the north by Río Inabón and barrio Sabana Llana of the municipality of Juana Díaz, on the south by the Caribbean Sea, on the west by Río Inabón, and on the east by Río Jacaguas.

In terms of barrio-to-barrio boundaries, Capitanejo is bounded on the north by barrio Vayas, in the south by the Caribbean Sea, in the west by barrio Vayas, and in the east by barrios Sabana Llana and Capitanejo of the municipality of Juana Díaz. Capitanejo has the distinction of being the only one of Ponce's 31 barrios that borders a barrio in another municipality with the same name.

Features and demographics
The communities of La Fe, La Plena, La Cuarta, Buyones, and Tiburones are located in  barrio Capitanejo.

In 2000, the population of Capitanejo was 1,404 persons, and it had a density of 355 persons per square mile.

In 2010, the population of Capitanejo was 1,011 persons, and it had a density of 257.3 persons per square mile.

The main roads serving Barrio Capitanejo are PR-1 and PR-510.

Notable landmarks
Capitanejo has the second shortest coastline of all of Ponce's five coastal barrios, after Bucaná.

See also

 List of communities in Puerto Rico

References

External links

Barrio Capitanejo
Populated coastal places in Puerto Rico
1831 establishments in Puerto Rico